The Lucero volcanic field is a monogenetic volcanic field located New Mexico, US. The field is located on the transition between the southeastern Colorado Plateau and the Rio Grande rift and was erupted in three pulses, at 8.3−6.2, 4.3−3.3, and 1.1−0 Mya.

The field erupted silica-poor (mafic) lavas ranging from low-alkali tholeiitic basalt to basanites and other alkaline magmas. The more recent eruptions are increasingly dominated by tholeiitic magmas, suggesting that the source region for the magma has become increasingly shallow over time. The pause between the first and second pulse coincides with a general decrease in volcanism on the Colorado Plateau and Rio Grande rift, while the pause between the second and third pulse seems to be local and to correspond to a shift in volcanism to the nearby Mount Taylor volcanic field. Older eruptive centers are located at higher elevations than younger eruptive centers, illustrating development of inverted topography as the landscape has evolved.

Because the field contains individual vents displaying hydromagmatic, Strombolian, and effusive eruption modes, and because the subsurface strata are well characterized, the field has been studied to develop models of entrainment of country rock in eruptive conduits.

Notable vents

See also
 List of volcanoes in the United States

References

Further reading
 
 
 

Volcanic fields of New Mexico
Monogenetic volcanic fields
Miocene volcanism
Pliocene volcanism
Pleistocene volcanism
Neogene geology of New Mexico
Quaternary geology of New Mexico
Miocene North America
Pliocene North America
Pleistocene North America